Kunguma Poovum Konjum Puravum is a 2009 Indian Tamil-language drama film written and directed by debutante Rajamohan. The film stars newcomers Ramakrishnan and Thananya, while Tharun Chatriya, Nagamma, and Agavamma play supporting roles. The film is produced by SPB Charan under his banner Capital Film Works and has music by Yuvan Shankar Raja. The film released on 24 April 2009.

Plot

Thulasi (Thananya) comes to Muttam village along with her grandmother (Nagamma) after her parents desert her. She joins a government school in the village to pursue her studies. Enters Koochan (Ramakrishnan), who instantly falls for her. Koochan's mother Chandra (Agavamma) helps the poor Thulasi to pursue her studies. However, coming to know about their romance, Agavamma insults Thulasi and her grandmother and drives them out of the village when Koochan is out on a school tour. A shocked Koochan returns only to meet with a road mishap. Meanwhile, Thulasi, who seeks refuge in a family at Tuticorin, is forced to marry a rowdy named Dharman (Tharun Chatriya). On the day of their marriage, Dharman gets arrested by the police. His wayward lifestyle invites trouble, and he eventually gets arrested for murdering a youth. An annoyed Thulasi returns to Muttam, only to see that Koochan has lost himself in liquor after his love failure. Meanwhile, Koochan resolves to set Thulasi's life right by helping her grandmother in getting Dharman out in bail. Eventually, Dharman returns to Muttam but ends up murdering another person in his drunken state. Koochan takes the blame on himself and ends up getting beaten up by the village people and arrested by the police. When Thulasi tries chasing the jeep in order to confess her husband's mistake and release Koochan, she meets with an accident. The movie ends with both their dead bodies being buried together and Dharman being arrested for his crime.

Cast
Ramakrishnan as Koochan
Thanaya as Thulasi
Tharun Chatriya as Dharman
Nagamma as Thulasi's grandmother
Agavamma as Chandra (Koochan's mother)

Production

Development
Nearly one year after the stupendous success of his film Chennai 600028, in May 2008, SPB Charan decided to produce his next film. He then got to meet Rajamohan, an erstwhile assistant, who worked under prominent directors like A. Venkatesh, Rajakumaran, and Vijay Milton. Rajamohan told Charan the story of his film, which he titled as "Kunguma Poovum Konjum Puravum", impressed of which, Charan decided to produce that film. Rajamohan became a director, since he wanted to fulfill the wish of his brother, who wanted to become a director, but died in an accident, before his wish was satisfied.

Casting
Rajamohan first approached Atharvaa for the lead role, but the actor was keen to debut with another project. When looking out for the actor to play the hero's role, Rajamohan saw Ramakrishan one day walking on the road, who was an assistant director of Cheran, and felt he would be the right person for the role and gave him the role of the protagonist. Tharshana, who later changed her name to Thananya, a second year medical student hailing from Andhra Pradesh, was picked as the heroine to play the female lead after she was discovered by Charan and Rajamohan in a medical college. Though she was hesitant at first, she eventually agreed to take over the role of Thulasi, after Charan and Rajamohan explained her the importance and the scope of her role in the film and convinced her.

Apart from Ramakrishnan and Tharshana, another newcomer, Tharun Chatriya, and an older woman, who dons the role of Thulasi's grandmother, are said to be important characters in the film. Moreover, eight assistant directors and some "lightmen" do act in the film as well, who Rajamohan and Charan wanted to pay a tribute for their hard work and the effort they put in. Yuvan Shankar Raja, a regular of Charan's films, was assigned as the music director, as were the other crew members, who had also worked for Charan's previous venture Chennai 600028.

Filming
The shooting of the film started on 9 June 2008 in Nagercoil and was entirely shot in a small village called "Muttam" near Nagercoil and in surrounding areas.

Soundtrack

The soundtrack is composed by Yuvan Shankar Raja which featured 6 tracks with lyrics written by Vaali and Gangai Amaran. Father S. P. Balasubrahmanyam and son SPB Charan, the producers of the film, have each sung one of the films, as did composer Yuvan Shankar Raja himself and his cousin Venkat Prabhu. The songs and the film score have been recorded using a live orchestra and without any electronic instruments such as synthesizers so as to create a rural feel to the film's music. The album was released on 10 January 2009 in Chennai at SRM Valliammai Engineering College at Kattankulathur, Kanchipuram district. Prior to the audio release, the team of the film conducted a two-day event at the campus, where rural games were organized and 30 winners were chosen to attend the audio release of the film along with big stars from the film industry.

The soundtrack was highly successful upon release, with Indiaglitz stated "Yuvan deserves credit for coming up with an album that is enjoyable and entertaining". Behindwoods gave 2.5 out of 5 saying "Though this film has strong rural overtones, you are surprised by the fact that you don’t get to hear violins and flutes as much as you’d have expected. Yuvan seems to have concentrated more on rhythms. Vaali scores again. Overall, the album is worth a listen". Pavithra Srinivasan of Rediff wrote "It might not contain a set of rocking tunes but this album is a collection of familiar tunes packaged in a refreshing way. Not blockbuster material but worth a listen." Karthik Srinivasan of Milliblog stated "Kunguma Poovum Konjum Puraavum sees Yuvan in a dithering form".

References

External links
 Official Website
 

2009 films
2000s Tamil-language films
Films scored by Yuvan Shankar Raja